The 1998 South Dakota gubernatorial election took place on November 3, 1998, to elect a Governor of South Dakota. Republican incumbent Bill Janklow was re-elected, defeating Democratic nominee Bernie Hunhoff.

General election

Results

References

1998
South Dakota
Gubernatorial